The Ben Show (also known as The Ben Show With Ben Hoffman) is an American sketch comedy television series created and hosted by comedian Ben Hoffman. The series premiered on February 28, 2013, on the American cable television network Comedy Central. Hoffman, Mike Gibbons, Itay Reiss, Derek Van Pelt, and Judi Brown Marmel serve as the show's executive producers.

The show was not renewed for a second season.

Premise
In each episode, Ben Hoffman undergoes a different "life journey," including forming a band, finding religion, auditioning for a reality show, and volunteering.  Hoffman seeks advice from people like his father, ex-girlfriends, and his therapist, who also help Hoffman in introducing the show's sketches.

Episodes

References

External links

2010s American sketch comedy television series
2013 American television series debuts
2013 American television series endings
English-language television shows
Comedy Central original programming